Jorge González von Marées (4 April 1900 – 14 March 1962), also known as El Jefe (Spanish: The chief, analogous to the Führer) was a Chilean political figure and author who served two terms as a member of the Chamber of Deputies and as mayor of Ñuñoa.

Born in Santiago to a German noble mother and to Marcial González, physician and founder of Clínica Alemana. He studied in Instituto Nacional General José Miguel Carrera, an elite public school back then, later studying Law and Engineering, the latter incomplete, in Universidad de Chile, Chile's most prestigious public university. He was ideologically influenced by Oswald Spengler.  On 5 April 1932 he founded the National Socialist Movement of Chile to oppose democratism, americanism, and communism.

González von Marées organized a failed coup d'état attempt on 5 September 1938, in which 58 young nacista members were shot to death by carabineros, in what became known as the Seguro Obrero massacre. He was sentenced to 20 years imprisonment, but subsequently pardoned by president Pedro Aguirre Cerda.

Works
 González von Marées, Jorge (1932). La concepción nacista del Estado. Santiago, Chile. 
 González von Marées, Jorge (1937). El problema del hambre. Santiago, Chile: Editorial Ercilla.
 González von Marées, Jorge (1939). Pueblo y Estado. Santiago, Chile. 
 González von Marées, Jorge (1940). El mal de Chile: Sus causas y remedios. Santiago, Chile: Ediciones Diego Portales.

See also
Carlos Keller
Chilean political scandals
Nazism in Chile

Notes

References
 Nacismo: National Socialism in Chile 1932-1938 by M. Potashnik, Ph.D. dissertation, University of California, Los Angeles 1974.
 Jorge González von Marées: Chief of Chilean Nacism by George F. W. Young, an article in Jahrbuch für Geschichte von Staat, Wirtschaft und Gesellschaft Lateinamerikas, Band 11, 1974
 The National Socialist Movement of Chile by H.E. Bicheno, Cambridge University thesis, 1976
 Biographical Dictionary of the Extreme Right Since 1890 edited by Philip Rees, 1991, 
 Black Sun: Aryan Cults, Esoteric Nazism and the Politics of Identity (Chap. 9) by Nicholas Goodrick-Clarke, 2001, 
 The Tragedy of Chile by Robert J. Alexander, Westport, Conn. : Greenwood Press, 1978

External links
 What Difference Does Gender Make? The Extreme Right in the ABC Countries in the Era of Fascism by Sandra McGee Deutsch
 Chile from the Antisemitism and Xenophobia Today (AXT) site

1900 births
1962 deaths
People from Santiago
Chilean people of Spanish descent
Chilean people of German descent
National Socialist Movement of Chile politicians
Popular Socialist Vanguard politicians
Liberal Party (Chile, 1849) politicians
Deputies of the XXXVIII Legislative Period of the National Congress of Chile
Deputies of the XXXIX Legislative Period of the National Congress of Chile
Nazis from outside Germany
Chilean anti-communists
Chilean essayists
Chilean political writers
20th-century essayists
Instituto Nacional General José Miguel Carrera alumni
University of Chile alumni